Ian Kilgour (23 October 1900 – 20 April 1977) was a Scotland international rugby union player.

Rugby Union career

Amateur career

He played rugby union for London Scottish.

At the time of his only cap for Scotland he was noted as playing for Royal Military College, Sandhurst.

Provincial career

He played for Anglo-Scots in the 1920 match against Provinces District.

International career

He received 1 cap for Scotland in 1921.

Family

He was born to Henry Kilgour (1847-1915) and Mary Smyth (1861-1945).

Kilgour married Aura Camilla Desmond Forestier-Walker on 25 October 1930.

Their daughter Joanna Camilla Kilgour (1931-2009) was born on 7 September 1931.

References

1900 births
1977 deaths
Scottish rugby union players
London Scottish F.C. players
Scotland international rugby union players
Scottish Exiles (rugby union) players
Rugby union wings